Bella Coola Airport  is located  northeast of Bella Coola, British Columbia, Canada.

This airport is limited to Day/VFR operations. Weather reports are available most days until 3PM local time by contacting Kamloops Flight Service (Nav Canada).

Airlines and destinations

References

External links
Page about this airport on COPA's Places to Fly airport directory

Certified airports in British Columbia
Central Coast Regional District